Theridiidae, also known as the tangle-web spiders, cobweb spiders and comb-footed spiders, is a large family of araneomorph spiders first described by Carl Jakob Sundevall in 1833. This diverse, globally distributed family includes over 3,000 species in 124 genera, and is the most common arthropod found in human dwellings throughout the world.

Theridiid spiders are both entelegyne, meaning that the females have a genital plate, and ecribellate, meaning that they spin sticky capture silk instead of woolly silk. They have a comb of serrated bristles (setae) on the tarsus of the fourth leg.

The family includes some model organisms for research, including the medically important widow spiders. They are important to studies characterizing their venom and its clinical manifestation, but widow spiders are also used in research on spider silk and sexual biology, including sexual cannibalism. Anelosimus are also model organisms, used for the study of sociality, because it has evolved frequently within the genus, allowing comparative studies across species, and because it contains species varying from solitary to permanently social. These spiders are also a promising model for the study of inbreeding because all permanently social species are highly inbred.

The Hawaiian Theridion grallator is used as a model to understand the selective forces and the genetic basis of color polymorphism within species. T. grallator is known as the "happyface" spider, as certain morphs have a pattern resembling a smiley face or a grinning clown face on their yellow body.

Webs
They often build tangle space webs, hence the common name, but Theridiidae has a large diversity of spider web forms. Many trap ants and other ground dwelling insects using elastic, sticky silk trap lines leading to the soil surface. Webs remain in place for extended periods and are expanded and repaired, but no regular pattern of web replacement has been observed.

The well studied kleptoparasitic members of Argyrodinae (Argyrodes, Faiditus, and Neospintharus) live in the webs of larger spiders and pilfer small prey caught by their host's web. They eat prey killed by the host spider, consume silk from the host web, and sometimes attack and eat the host itself.

Theridiid gumfoot-webs consist of frame lines that anchor them to surroundings and of support threads, which possess viscid silk. These can either have a central retreat (Achaearanea-type) or a peripheral retreat (Latrodectus-type). Building gum-foot lines is a unique, stereotyped behaviour, and is likely homologous for Theridiidae and its sister family Nesticidae.

Among webs without gumfooted lines, some contain viscid silk (Theridion-type) and some that are sheet-like, which do not contain viscid silk (Coleosoma-type). However, there are many undescribed web forms.

Genera

The largest genus is Theridion with over 600 species, but it is not monophyletic. Parasteatoda, previously Achaearanea, is another large genus that includes the North American common house spider.
, the World Spider Catalog accepts the following genera:

Achaearanea Strand, 1929 – Africa, Asia, Australia, South America, Central America
Achaearyopa Barrion & Litsinger, 1995 – Philippines
Achaeridion Wunderlich, 2008 – Turkey
Allothymoites Ono, 2007 – China, Japan
Ameridion Wunderlich, 1995 – Central America, Caribbean, Mexico, South America
Anatea Berland, 1927 – Australia
Anatolidion Wunderlich, 2008 – Africa, Europe, Turkey
Anelosimus Simon, 1891 – Asia, Africa, North America, South America, Oceania, Central America, Caribbean
Argyrodella Saaristo, 2006 – Seychelles
Argyrodes Simon, 1864 – Africa, Asia, Oceania, North America, South America, Jamaica
Ariamnes Thorell, 1869 – Costa Rica, South America, Asia, Africa, Oceania, Mexico, Cuba
Asagena Sundevall, 1833 – North America, Asia, Europe, Algeria
Asygyna Agnarsson, 2006 – Madagascar
Audifia Keyserling, 1884 – Guinea-Bissau, Congo, Brazil
Bardala Saaristo, 2006 – Seychelles
Borneoridion Deeleman & Wunderlich, 2011 – Indonesia
Brunepisinus Yoshida & Koh, 2011 – Indonesia
Cabello Levi, 1964 – Venezuela
Cameronidion Wunderlich, 2011 – Malaysia
Campanicola Yoshida, 2015 – Asia
Canalidion Wunderlich, 2008 – Russia
Carniella Thaler & Steinberger, 1988 – Europe, Angola, Asia
Cephalobares O. Pickard-Cambridge, 1871 – Sri Lanka, China
Cerocida Simon, 1894 – Brazil, Venezuela, Guyana
Chikunia Yoshida, 2009 – Asia
Chorizopella Lawrence, 1947 – South Africa
Chrosiothes Simon, 1894 – North America, South America, Central America, Caribbean, Asia
Chrysso O. Pickard-Cambridge, 1882 – North America, South America, Central America, Asia, Trinidad, Europe
Coleosoma O. Pickard-Cambridge, 1882 – United States, South America, Seychelles, Asia, New Zealand
Coscinida Simon, 1895 – Asia, Africa
Craspedisia Simon, 1894 – Brazil
Crustulina Menge, 1868 – Ukraine, United States, Africa, Oceania, Asia
Cryptachaea Archer, 1946 – South America, North America, Oceania, Central America, Asia, Trinidad, Belgium
Cyllognatha L. Koch, 1872 – Samoa, Australia, India
Deelemanella Yoshida, 2003 – Indonesia
Dipoena Thorell, 1869 – North America, Oceania, Asia, Central America, South America, Caribbean, Africa, Europe
Dipoenata Wunderlich, 1988 – Panama, South America, Malta
Dipoenura Simon, 1909 – Asia, Sierra Leone
Echinotheridion Levi, 1963 – South America
Emertonella Bryant, 1945 – North America, Asia, Papua New Guinea
Enoplognatha Pavesi, 1880 – Asia, Europe, Australia, Africa, North America, South America
Episinus Walckenaer, 1809 – Asia, South America, Europe, North America, New Zealand, Central America, Africa, Caribbean
Euryopis Menge, 1868 – Asia, North America, South America, Jamaica, Europe, Oceania, Africa, Panama
Eurypoena Wunderlich, 1992 – Canary Is.
Exalbidion Wunderlich, 1995 – Central America, South America, Mexico
Faiditus Keyserling, 1884 – South America, North America, Central America, Caribbean, Asia
Gmogala Keyserling, 1890 – Papua New Guinea, Australia
Grancanaridion Wunderlich, 2011 – Canary Is.
Guaraniella Baert, 1984 – Brazil, Paraguay
Hadrotarsus Thorell, 1881 – Oceania, Belgium, Taiwan
Helvibis Keyserling, 1884 – South America, Panama, Trinidad
Helvidia Thorell, 1890 – Indonesia
Hentziectypus Archer, 1946 – Caribbean, Panama, North America, South America
Heterotheridion Wunderlich, 2008 – Turkey, Russia, China
Hetschkia Keyserling, 1886 – Brazil
Histagonia Simon, 1895 – South Africa
Icona Forster, 1955 – New Zealand
Jamaitidion Wunderlich, 1995 – Jamaica
Janula Strand, 1932 – Asia, South America, Australia, Panama, Trinidad
Keijiella Yoshida, 2016 – Asia
Kochiura Archer, 1950 – Chile, Turkey, Brazil
Landoppo Barrion & Litsinger, 1995 – Philippines
Lasaeola Simon, 1881 – Europe, North America, Panama, South America, Asia
Latrodectus Walckenaer, 1805 – South America, North America, Asia, Europe, Oceania, Africa
Macaridion Wunderlich, 1992 – Europe
Magnopholcomma Wunderlich, 2008 – Australia
Meotipa Simon, 1894 – Asia, Papua New Guinea
Molione Thorell, 1892 – Asia
Moneta O. Pickard-Cambridge, 1871 – Oceania, Asia, Seychelles
Montanidion Wunderlich, 2011 – Malaysia
Nanume Saaristo, 2006 – Seychelles
Neopisinus Marques, Buckup & Rodrigues, 2011 – Panama, Caribbean, South America, North America
Neospintharus Exline, 1950 – North America, Asia, South America, Central America
Neottiura Menge, 1868 – Asia, Europe, Algeria
Nesopholcomma Ono, 2010 – Japan
Nesticodes Archer, 1950 – Asia, New Zealand
Nihonhimea Yoshida, 2016 – Asia, Seychelles, Oceania, Mexico
Nipponidion Yoshida, 2001 – Japan
Nojimaia Yoshida, 2009 – China, Japan
Ohlertidion Wunderlich, 2008 – Greenland, Russia
Okumaella Yoshida, 2009 – Japan
Paidiscura Archer, 1950 – Europe, Algeria, Asia
Parasteatoda Archer, 1946 – Asia, Oceania, Cuba, North America, Argentina, Seychelles
Paratheridula Levi, 1957 – United States, Chile
Pholcomma Thorell, 1869 – Oceania, North America, Asia, South America
Phoroncidia Westwood, 1835 – Asia, Africa, North America, Caribbean, South America, Oceania, Europe, Costa Rica
Phycosoma O. Pickard-Cambridge, 1879 – North America, Asia, Africa, Jamaica, Panama, Brazil, New Zealand
Phylloneta Archer, 1950 – Asia, United States, Spain
Platnickina Koçak & Kemal, 2008 – North America, Asia, Africa
Proboscidula Miller, 1970 – Angola, Rwanda
Propostira Simon, 1894 – India, Sri Lanka
Pycnoepisinus Wunderlich, 2008 – Kenya
Rhomphaea L. Koch, 1872 – Asia, Africa, South America, Oceania, North America, Europe, Central America, Saint Vincent and the Grenadines
Robertus O. Pickard-Cambridge, 1879 – Europe, North America, Asia, Congo
Ruborridion Wunderlich, 2011 – India
Rugathodes Archer, 1950 – Asia, North America
Sardinidion Wunderlich, 1995 – Africa, Europe
Selkirkiella Berland, 1924 – Chile, Argentina
Sesato Saaristo, 2006 – Seychelles
Seycellesa Koçak & Kemal, 2008 – Seychelles
Simitidion Wunderlich, 1992 – Europe, Asia, Canada
Spheropistha Yaginuma, 1957 – Japan, China
Spinembolia Saaristo, 2006 – Seychelles
Spintharus Hentz, 1850 – Pakistan, Caribbean, Mexico, Brazil
Steatoda Sundevall, 1833 – Oceania, North America, Asia, Europe, South America, Africa
Stemmops O. Pickard-Cambridge, 1894 – South America, North America, Central America, Caribbean, Asia
Stoda Saaristo, 2006 – Seychelles
Styposis Simon, 1894 – United States, South America, Central America, Congo
Takayus Yoshida, 2001 – Asia
Tamanidion Wunderlich, 2011 – Malaysia
Tekellina Levi, 1957 – United States, Brazil, Asia
Theonoe Simon, 1881 – Tanzania, Europe, North America
Theridion Walckenaer, 1805 – Asia, North America, Central America, Europe, South America, Africa, Oceania, Caribbean
Theridula Emerton, 1882 – Spain, Africa, North America, Central America, Asia, South America
Thwaitesia O. Pickard-Cambridge, 1881 – Panama, South America, Africa, Asia, Oceania, Trinidad
Thymoites Keyserling, 1884 – South America, Central America, Asia, North America, Caribbean, Greenland, Tanzania
Tidarren Chamberlin & Ivie, 1934 – Africa, Yemen, North America, Argentina, Costa Rica
Tomoxena Simon, 1895 – Indonesia, India
Wamba O. Pickard-Cambridge, 1896 – North America, South America, Panama
Wirada Keyserling, 1886 – Mexico, South America
Yaginumena Yoshida, 2002 – Asia
Yoroa Baert, 1984 – Papua New Guinea, Australia
Yunohamella Yoshida, 2007 – Asia, Europe
Zercidium Benoit, 1977 – St. Helena

About 35 extinct genera have also been placed in the family. The oldest known stem-group member of the family is Cretotheridion from the Cenomanian aged Burmese amber of Myanmar.

See also
 List of Theridiidae species

References

Further reading 
 Agnarsson I. 2006c. Phylogenetic placement of Echinotheridion (Araneae: Theridiidae) - do male sexual organ removal, emasculation, and sexual cannibalism in Echinotheridion and Tidarren represent evolutionary replicas? Invertebrate Systematics 20: 415-429. PDF
 Agnarsson I. 2004. Morphological phylogeny of cobweb spiders and their relatives (Araneae, Araneoidea, Theridiidae). Zoological Journal of the Linnean Society 141: 447-626. PDF
 Arnedo, M.A., Coddington, J., Agnarsson, I. & Gillespie, R.G. (2004). From a comb to a tree: phylogenetic relationships of the comb-footed spiders (Araneae, Theridiidae) inferred from nuclear and mitochondrial genes. Molecular Phylogenetics and Evolution 31:225-245. PDF
 Arnedo MA, Agnarsson I, Gillespie RG. In Press. Molecular insights into the phylogenetic structure of the spider genus Theridion (Araneae, Theridiidae) and the origin of the Hawaiian Theridion-like fauna. Zoologica Scripta.
 Aviles, L., Maddison, W.P. and Agnarsson, I. 2006. A new independently derived social spider with explosive colony proliferation and a female size dimorphism. Biotropica, 38: 743-753.
 Gillespie, R.G. and Tabashnik, B.E. 1994. Foraging Behavior of the Hawaiian Happy Face Spider (Araneae, Theridiidae). Annals of the Entomological Society of America, 87: 815-822.
 Oxford, G.S. and Gillespie, R.G. 1996. Genetics of a colour polymorphism in Theridion grallator (Araneae: Theridiidae), the Hawaiian happy-face spider, from greater Maui. Heredity, 76: 238-248.

External links

 Platnick, N.I. 2006. World Spider Catalog
 Key to several Theridiidae genera
 Tree of Life: Theridiidae
 Theridiidae research

 
Extant Cretaceous first appearances
Araneomorphae families